Choe Su-hon (born 7 October 1939) is the former vice foreign minister of North Korea who dealt principally with North Korea's relations with the European Union. He was replaced in this role in 2005 by Kung Sok-ung. It is unclear what position Choe now holds.

References

External links
https://www.un.org/webcast/ga/61/pdfs/korea-e.pdf

Living people
1939 births
Government ministers of North Korea
Place of birth missing (living people)